H33 may refer to:
 H-33 (Michigan county highway)
 Bell H-33, an experimental American tiltrotor aircraft
 Hanriot H.33, a French biplane
 Highway H33 (Ukraine)
 , a Royal Navy H-class submarine
 , a Royal Navy V-class destroyer
 Retinal detachment